Graham Calverley (born 30 November 1943) is  a former Australian rules footballer who played with Fitzroy in the Victorian Football League (VFL).

Notes

External links 
		

Living people
1943 births
Australian rules footballers from Victoria (Australia)
Fitzroy Football Club players
People educated at St Joseph's College, Melbourne